Son 14 is a fourteen-member son band from Santiago, Cuba, formed on November 11, 1978 by Adalberto Álvarez and Eduardo 'El Tiburon' Morales. In 1984, after having been the group's director for six years, Álvarez left Son 14 to start the orchestra Adalberto Álvarez y su Son in Havana.

Partial discography
A Bayamo En Coche (Areito, 1980)
Son Como Son (Areito, 1981)
Adalberto Alvarez presenta Son 14 (Areito, 1981)
Damelo (Philips, 1983)
Tumi Cuba Classics, Vol. 4: Son the Big Sound (Tumi, 1995)
(with Tiburon) Cubania (Tumi, 1997)

References

Musical groups established in 1978
1978 establishments in Cuba
Son cubano groups
Philips Records artists
Cuban musical groups